Nikolay Uliyanin (born 26 December 1977) is a Kazakhstani speed skater. He competed in the men's 1500 metres event at the 2002 Winter Olympics.

References

1977 births
Living people
Kazakhstani male speed skaters
Olympic speed skaters of Kazakhstan
Speed skaters at the 2002 Winter Olympics
People from Kostanay
Speed skaters at the 1999 Asian Winter Games
Speed skaters at the 2003 Asian Winter Games
21st-century Kazakhstani people